Champniers may refer to several communes in France:

 Champniers, Charente
 Champniers, Vienne
 Champniers-et-Reilhac, Dordogne